Pompano Beach Municipal Stadium was a stadium in Pompano Beach, Florida primarily used for professional and amateur baseball from 1957 until its demolition in 2008. The ballpark was dedicated on March 22, 1957, and held 4,500 people. The stadium was the home of the Washington Senators and Texas Rangers at spring training from 1961 until 1986, multiple minor league clubs, and the Pompano Beach High School baseball team.

Spring training and minor league baseball

It served as the spring training home of the Washington Senators from 1961 to 1971 and the Texas Rangers from 1972 through 1986.

The stadium was home to multiple minor league teams including the Florida State League Pompano Beach Mets and Pompano Beach Cubs, as well as the Miami Miracle in 1990 and 1991. The 1989 Senior Professional Baseball Association Gold Coast Suns split their home games between Bobby Maduro-Miami Stadium and Municipal Stadium.

The Fort Lauderdale Strikers of the APSL used it as their home field in 1990 after the Broward School District via the school board, denied the team access to Lockhart Stadium.

Improvements

In 1980 new night lighting, seat and fences were installed at a cost of $227,000. Improvements in 1984 included a new practice infield, public address system, re-carpeting of the clubhouse and rewiring of the concession stands.

Current use

The stadium was demolished in 2008 and the land repurposed into multiple baseball fields. The baseball complex is managed by the City of Pompano Beach and hosts Federal League Semi-Pro Baseball, high school, and other amateur baseball games.

References

Further reading

External links
Pompano Municipal Stadium Gallery at digitalballparks.com
Map with overlay showing where stadium used to be
Federal League Semi-Pro Baseball, current tenants.

Grapefruit League venues
Minor league baseball venues
Texas Rangers spring training venues
Washington Senators (1961–1971) stadiums
Buildings and structures in Pompano Beach, Florida
Soccer venues in Florida
Fort Lauderdale Strikers sports facilities
1957 establishments in Florida
Sports venues completed in 1957
2008 disestablishments in Florida
Sports venues demolished in 2008
Defunct minor league baseball venues
Defunct baseball venues in the United States
Defunct soccer venues in the United States